Harry Owen Parry (22 January 1912 – 18 October 1956) was a Welsh jazz clarinetist and bandleader.

Biography
Parry was born in Bangor, Wales. He played cornet, tenor horn, flugelhorn, drums, and violin as a child, and began on clarinet and saxophone in 1927. After moving to London in 1932, he played with several dance bands, including Percival Mackey's, then led his own six-piece unit. He was engaged at the St. Regis Hotel in 1940 when he was selected by the BBC to lead the band for their Radio Rhythm Club show. He then proceeded to record over 100 titles for Parlophone Records with his sextet, which included George Shearing and Doreen Villiers as members.

Following World War II Parry worked extensively for radio and television, including as a disc jockey. He toured worldwide as a bandleader in the late 1940s and 1950s, including in the Middle East and India. Parry was stylistically indebted to Benny Goodman, a comparison not lost on contemporary critics.  He died in his flat in Mayfair, London, in October 1956.

Parry married Jeannie Bradbury, a singer for the BBC's wartime General Forces Programme in 1945, but the pair divorced in 1956.

References

Biography
Clarrie Henry, "Harry Parry". Grove Jazz online.
Gwilym Arthur Jones,  PARRY, OWEN HENRY (HARRY PARRY; 1912-1956), jazz musician, Dictionary of Welsh Biography

1912 births
1956 deaths
Welsh jazz musicians
British jazz bandleaders
British jazz clarinetists
People from Bangor, Gwynedd
20th-century British musicians
20th-century British male musicians
British male jazz musicians